The Samoan crisis was a standoff between the United States, the German Empire, and the British Empire from 1887 to 1889 over control of the Samoan Islands during the First Samoan Civil War.

Background 
In 1878, the United States acquired a fuelling station at the harbor at Pago Pago, on the island of Tutuila, in exchange for providing guarantees of protection to Samoa. The German Empire on the other hand desired concessions at the harbor at Apia, on the island of Upolu.

Incident 

The standoff ended when the 1889 Apia cyclone, on 15 and 16 March, wrecked all six warships in the harbour. Calliope escaped the harbour and thus survived the storm. Robert Louis Stevenson did not witness the storm and its aftermath at Apia but after December 1889 arrival to Samoa, he wrote about the event. The Second Samoan Civil War, involving Germany, the United States, and Britain, eventually resulted in the Tripartite Convention of 1899, which partitioned the Samoan Islands into American Samoa and German Samoa.

Legacy 
Walter LaFeber said that the incident made some 'reticent Americans' realise the power implications of expansion in the South Pacific.

Gallery

See also
 Samoan Civil War
 Second Samoan Civil War
 Siege of Apia
 German Samoa

References

Further reading 
 Andre Trudeau, Noah. "'An Appalling Calamity'--In the teeth of the Great Samoan Typhoon of 1889, a standoff between the German and US navies suddenly didn't matter." Naval History Magazine 25.2 (2011): 54-59.
 
 
 
 
 
 
 
 

.
Samoa Crisis
Samoa Crisis
Samoa Crisis
Samoa Crisis
Samoa Crisis
Samoa Crisis
1887 in Samoa
1888 in Samoa
1889 in Samoa
Samoa crisis
Samoa crisis
Samoa crisis
Political history of Samoa
History of United States expansionism
Wars involving Samoa
Conflicts involving the German Empire
History of the foreign relations of Germany
Military operations involving Germany
Military expeditions of the United States
Military operations involving the United States
Naval history of Germany
United States Navy in the 19th century
19th-century military history of the United Kingdom
Shipwrecks of Samoa
Samoa crisis
1880s in Oceania
Germany–Samoa relations
Samoa–United Kingdom relations
Samoa–United States relations
Germany–United Kingdom relations
Germany–United States relations
19th century in Samoa